.

Names
 Bara (name), a given name and surname
 Barah (surname) or Borah, an Assamese surname

Places

Bhutan
 Bara Gewog, a former village block of Samtse District

Bosnia and Herzegovina
 Bara Lake
 Bara, Bosanski Petrovac, a village in Bosanski Petrovac municipality

Germany
 Bära, a river in Baden-Württemberg

India
 Bara, Punjab, a village and archaeological site
 Bara, Allahabad, a town in Uttar Pradesh
 Bara, Dildarnagar, a village in Uttar Pradesh
 Bara, North 24 Parganas, a census town in West Bengal
 Bara, Raebareli, a village in Uttar Pradesh

Iran
 Bara, Iran, a village in Kurdistan Province

Mali
 Bara, Gao Region, a village and rural commune

Nepal
 Bara District, Nepal

Nigeria
 Bara, Nigeria, a town in Oyo State

Pakistan
 Bara, FATA, a town in the Khyber Agency, Federally Administered Tribal Areas
 Bara Tehsil, a district in the Federally Administered Tribal Areas
 Bara River, Khyber Agency

Poland
 Bara, West Pomeranian Voivodeship, Poland

Romania
 Bara, Timiș, a commune in Timiș County
 Bâra, a commune in Neamţ County
 Bâra, a village in Bereni Commune, Mureș County
 Bâra, a village in Balta Doamnei Commune, Prahova County

Slovakia
 Bara, Trebišov, a village in Trebišov District, Slovakia

Spain
 Bara, Aragon, a village in Sabiñánigo, Spain

Sudan
 Barah, Sudan, a town in Kurdufan, Sudan

Sweden
 Bara Hundred, a locality in Scania
 Bara, Scania, Svedala Municipality
 Bara, part of Hörsne-Bara, Gotland

Syria
 Bara, Syria, a village

UK
 Bara, East Lothian, a parish in Scotland

Other uses
 Bara, a former Chilean unit of measurement
 Bara or Tetsuo Sakaibara, Japanese musician and former member of Merzbow
 Bara, a unit of absolute pressure; see bar (unit)
 Bara, a painting by Jean Jacques Henner
 Bara (drum), a drum used in Burkina Faso and Côte d'Ivoire
 Bara (film), a 1980 Indian Kannada-language film
 Bara (genre), a genre of Japanese media, especially comics, aimed at gay men
 Bara (insect), a genus of insects in the family Tetrigidae called ground-hoppers
 Bara people, a people of central southern Madagascar
 Bara Rifles, a Pakistani paramilitary regiment
 British Automation and Robot Association
 Chris Hani Baragwanath Hospital or Bara, a hospital in Johannesburg, South Africa
 Vada (food) or Bara, a savoury fritter-type snack from South India

See also
 Bara culture, a strand of the Indus Valley Civilization in Bronze Age India
 Bara language (disambiguation)

Language and nationality disambiguation pages